The men's light bantamweight (51 kg/112.2 lbs) Low-Kick category at the W.A.K.O. World Championships 2007 in Belgrade was the lightest of the male Low-Kick tournaments, involving twelve fighters from three continents (Europe, Asia and Africa).  Each of the matches was three rounds of two minutes each and were fought under Low-Kick rules.   

Due to there being too few competitors for a tournament that was meant for sixteen, four fighters had a bye through to the quarter finals.   The tournament gold medalist was Azerbaijan's Zaur Mammadov who beat Italian Ivan Sciolla in the final by way of split decision.  As a result of reaching the semi finals, defeated fighters Kyrgyzstan's Utkin Hudoyanov and Bulgarian Aleksandar Aleksandrov were rewarded with bronze medals.

Results

Key

See also
List of WAKO Amateur World Championships
List of WAKO Amateur European Championships
List of male kickboxers

References

External links
 WAKO World Association of Kickboxing Organizations Official Site

Kickboxing events at the WAKO World Championships 2007 Belgrade
2007 in kickboxing
Kickboxing in Serbia